Doru Frîncu or Doru Francu-Cioclei (born 5 May 1954) is a Romanian bobsledder. He competed in the four man event at the 1980 Winter Olympics.

Frîncu was coach to the Australian Olympic bobsleigh team from as early as 1989 through 2006. His mentees included Grant Edwards. Since 2009, Frîncu has taught physical education at Glenunga International High School, South Australia.

References

External links
 

1954 births
Living people
Romanian male bobsledders
Olympic bobsledders of Romania
Bobsledders at the 1980 Winter Olympics
People from Mehedinți County